uMkhuze Game Reserve (also spelt Mkhuze or Mkuze) is a  game reserve in northern Zululand, KwaZulu-Natal, South Africa. It was proclaimed a protected area on 15 February 1912.

Wildlife
African bush elephant
Blue wildebeest
African buffalo
Cape wild dog 
Hyena
Hippopotamus
South African giraffe 
Greater kudu
South African cheetah
African leopard
Lion
Nile crocodile
Steenbok
South-central black rhinoceros and Southern white rhinoceros
Burchell's zebra

The reserve has a diversity of natural habitats which include acacia savannah, mixed woodland, sand forest, riverine forest, rivers and pans, grassland, cliffs and rocky ridges.

Accommodation
 Mantuma Main Camp
 Nhlonhlela Bush Lodge
 Umkhumbe Tented Bush Lodge

See also 
 Protected areas of South Africa
 Greater St Lucia Wetland Park
 Phinda Resource Reserve

References

External links 
 KwaZulu-Natal Provincial Government homepage
 

1912 establishments in South Africa
Ezemvelo KZN Wildlife Parks
Nature reserves in South Africa
Protected areas of South Africa
Protected areas established in 1912